Brandende liefde (Dutch for Burning Love) is a 1983 Dutch drama film directed by Ate de Jong.

Cast
Monique van de Ven	... 	Anna
Peter Jan Rens	... 	Jan Bosman
Ellen Vogel	... 	Mademoiselle Bonnema
Huub van der Lubbe	... 	Kees van de Plasse
Siem Vroom	... 	Vader Bonnema
Berend Boudewijn	... 	Louis Laman
Hetty Blok	... 	Executrice Testamentaire
Bernard Mesguich	... 	Cultureel Attaché (as Bernard Mesquish)
Eliza Naber	... 	Parisienne
Maya van den Broecke	... 	Sonja
Marc Klein Essink	... 	Eric
Swaantje Rutten	... 	Louise
Jitske Dijkstra	... 	Lida
Johan Mittertreiner	... 	Dansleraar
Robert de Jonker	... 	Knul

External links 
 

Dutch drama films
1983 films
1980s Dutch-language films
Films produced by Rob Houwer
Films directed by Ate de Jong